The 2007 Stuttgart Open (known for sponsorship reasons as the Mercedes Cup) was a men's tennis tournament played on outdoor clay courts. It was the 30th edition of the Mercedes Cup, and was part of the International Series Gold of the 2007 ATP Tour. It took place at the Tennis Club Weissenhof in Stuttgart, Germany, from 16 July through 23 July 2008.

Rafael Nadal won his fifth clay title of the year, and sixth title overall.

Finals

Singles

 Rafael Nadal defeated  Stanislas Wawrinka 6–4, 7–5

Doubles

 František Čermák /  Leoš Friedl defeated  Guillermo García-López /  Fernando Verdasco 6–4, 6–4

External links
Singles draw
Doubles draw

Stuttgart Open
Stuttgart Open
2007 in German tennis